Veľká Fatra National Park is a National Park in Slovakia. Most of it lies in the southern part of the Žilina Region and a small part in the northern part of Banská Bystrica Region. The national park and its protective zone comprise most of the Greater Fatra Range which belongs to the Outer Western Carpathians.

The National Park was declared on 1 April 2002 as an upgrade of the Protected Landscape Area of the same name established in 1972 to protect a mountain range with a high percentage of well-preserved Carpathian forests, with prevailing European beech, which cover 90% of the area in combination with ridge-top cattle pastures dating back to the 15th – 17th centuries, to the times of the so-called Walachian colonisation. In places there are also relict Scots pine forests and the Harmanec valley is notable as the richest Irish yew tree location in Central and probably all Europe. NP Veľká Fatra is also an important reservoir of fresh water thanks to high rainfalls and low evaporation in the area. The core of the range is built of granite which reaches the surface only in places, more common are various slates creating gently modelled ridges and summits of the so-called Hôlna Fatra and limestone and dolomite strata creating a rough and picturesque terrain of the so-called Bralná Fatra. There are also many karst features, namely caves, Harmanec Cave being the only one open to the public.

Various rocks and therefore various soils, diverse type of terrain with gentle upland meadows and pastures, sharp cliffs and deep valleys provide for extremely rich flora and fauna. All species of big Central European carnivores live abundantly there: brown bear, grey wolf and Eurasian lynx.

The area is popular with tourists, mainly hikers and trekkers as there rather few resorts, located outside the National Park. The UNESCO World Heritage village of Vlkolínec with well-preserved log cabins lies nearby.

Small protected areas

As of February 2007, there were following small protected areas within the NP Veľká Fatra and its buffer zone:

Resources

External links
Veľká Fatra National Park at Slovakia.travel

National parks of Slovakia
Protected areas of the Western Carpathians

Protected areas established in 2002
2002 establishments in Slovakia
Tourist attractions in Žilina Region
Geography of Žilina Region
Tourist attractions in Banská Bystrica Region